Ivan Tauferer (born 26 January 1995) is an Italian former professional ice hockey player, who last played for HC Bolzano in the ICE Hockey League; he also played for the Italian national team.

He represented Italy at the 2019 IIHF World Championship.

Tauferer retired at the end of the 2021-2022 season due to a wrist injury.

References

External links

1995 births
Living people
Italian ice hockey defencemen
Bolzano HC players
Ritten Sport players
Ice hockey people from Bolzano